Daimon Shelton (born September 15, 1972) is a former American football Fullback from Sacramento State, Shelton was selected by the Jacksonville Jaguars in the sixth round of the 1997 NFL Draft.

1972 births
Living people
Sportspeople from Los Angeles County, California
American football fullbacks
African-American players of American football
Sacramento State Hornets football players
Buffalo Bills players
Chicago Bears players
Jacksonville Jaguars players
People from Duarte, California
Players of American football from California
21st-century African-American sportspeople
20th-century African-American sportspeople